This is a list of works by German composer Hans Werner Henze (1926 – 2012). Many of them are published by Schott Music.

Operas, music-theatre and other dramatic works
Das Wundertheater (1948, première 1949)
Die Gefangenen (1950)
Boulevard Solitude (1951, première 1952)
Ein Landarzt, radio opera (1951; stage version 1964, première 1965; revised 1994)
Der tolle Tag (1951; withdrawn)
Sodom und Gomorrha (1952)
Das Ende einer Welt, radio opera (1953; stage version 1964, première 1965; revised 1993)
König Hirsch (1952–55, première 1956; revised 1962 as Il re cervo oder Die Irrfahrten der Wahrheit (première 1963)
Der sechste Gesang (1955)
Die Zikaden (1955; withdrawn)
Der Prinz von Homburg (1958, première 1960; new orchestration 1991)
Elegy for Young Lovers (Elegie für junge Liebende) (1959–61, première 1961; revised 1987)
Les caprices de Marianne (1962; withdrawn)
Muriel ou Le temps d'un retour (1963; film score)
Der Frieden (1964)
The Bassarids (Die Bassariden) (1964–65, première 1966)
Der junge Lord (1964, première 1965)
Der junge Törless (1966; film score)
Moralities (1967, premiere 1968; revised 1970)
Das Floß der Medusa (1968, oratorio)
El Cimarrón (1970–1971, musical work)
Der langwierige Weg in die Wohnung der Natascha Ungeheuer (1971)
La Cubana, oder Ein Leben für die Kunst (1973, première 1974; chamber version La piccola Cubana 1990-91)
We Come to the River (1974–76, première 1976)
The Lost Honour of Katharina Blum (1975; film score)
 (1978; film score)
The Woman (1978; withdrawn)
Orpheus (1978; Viennese version 1986)
Pollicino (1979–80, première 1980)
Montezuma (1980; a film score)
The English Cat (1980–83, première 1983; revised 1990)
Nach Lissabon (1982)
Un amour de Swann (1983; film score)
L'amour à mort (1984)
Das verratene Meer (1986–89, Deutsche Oper Berlin, 5 May 1990)
Gogo No Eiko (1990, première of the first version in German, Deutsche Oper Berlin, 2006, première of the second version in Japanese, Salzburger Festspiele)
Venus und Adonis (1993–95, Bavarian State Opera, Munich, 11 January 1997)
L'Upupa und der Triumph der Sohnesliebe (2000–03, Salzburg Festival, 12 August 2003)
Phaedra (Berlin State Opera, 6 September 2007)
Gisela! oder: die merk- und denkwürdigen Wege des Glücks (Ruhrtriennale, September 2010)

Symphonies
Symphony no. 1 (1947; revised 1963, 1991, and 2005—the last version renamed Kammerkonzert 05)
Symphony no. 2 (1949)
Symphony no. 3 (1949–50)
Symphony no. 4 (1955)
Vokalsinfonie (1955; this is taken from König Hirsch)
Symphony no. 5 (1962)
Symphony no. 6 (1969; revised 1994)
Symphony no. 7 (1983–84)
Symphony no. 8 (1992–93)
Symphony no. 9 (1995–97)
Symphony no. 10 (1997–2000)

Other works for large forces
Kammerkonzert (1946)
Concertino (1947)
Violin Concerto no. 1 (1947)
Suite (1949)
Piano Concerto no. 1 (1950)
Sinfonische Variationen (1950; withdrawn)
Sinfonische Zwischenspiele (1951)
Tancredi (1952)
Tanz und Salonmusik (1952; revised 1989)
Ode an den Westwind for cello and orchestra (1953)
Quattro poemi (1955)
Sinfonische Etüden (1956; revised as Drei sinfonische Etüden in 1964)
Maratona (1956)
Jeux des Tritons (1956–57; revised 1967)
Hochzeitsmusik (1957)
Sonata per archi (1957–58)
Drei Dithyramben (1958)
Trois pas des Triton (1958)
Undine, Suite no. 1 (1958)
Undine, Suite no. 2 (1958)
Antifone (1960)
Los caprichos (1963)
Zwischenspiele (1964)
Mänadentanz (1965)
In memoriam: die weisse Rose (1965)
Double Bass Concerto (1966)
Double Concerto (1966)
Fantasia for Strings (1966)
Piano Concerto no. 2 (1967)
Telemanniana (1967)
Compases para preguntas ensimismadas (1969–70)
Violin Concerto no. 2 (1971; revised 1991)
Heliogabalus imperator, allegoria per musica (1971–72; revised 1986)
Tristan (1972–3)
Ragtimes and Habaneras (1975)
Aria de la folía española (1977)
Il Vitalino raddoppiato (1977)
Apollo trionfante (1979)
Arien des Orpheus (1979)
Barcarola (1979)
Dramatische Szenen aus ‘Orpheus’ I (1979)
Spielmusiken (1979–80)
Deutschlandsberger Mohrentanz no. 1 (1984)
Kleine Elegien (1984–85)
Englische Liebeslieder for cello and orchestra (1984–85)
Deutschlandsberger Mohrentanz no. 2 (1985)
Fandango (1986 with Daniel Barenboim; revised 1992)
Cinque piccoli concerti e ritornelli (1987)
Requiem: 9 geistliche Konzerte (1990–93)
La selva incantata, aria and rondo (1991)
Introduktion, Thema und Variationen (1992)
Appassionatamente, fantasia (1993–4)
Seconda sonata per archi (1995)
Erlkönig, fantasia (1996)
Pulcinellas Erzählungen (1996)
Sieben Boleros (1996)
Violin Concerto no. 3, Three Portraits from T. Mann's Doktor Faustus (1996)
Zigeunerweisen und Sarabanden (1996)
Fraternité, air (1999)
A Tempest, rounds (2000)
Scorribanda Sinfonica (2000–01)
L’heure bleue (2001)
Sebastian im Traum (2004)
Fünf Botschaften für die Königin von Saba (2004)

Ballets
Ballet-Variationen (1949, first staged 1958; revised 1992)
Jack Pudding (1949, premiere 1950; withdrawn)
Das Vokaltuch der Kammersängerin Rosa Silber (1950, first staged 1958; revised 1990)
Le Tombeau d'Orphée (1950, withdrawn)
Labyrinth (1951, premiere 1952; revised 1996)
Der Idiot (1952, premiere 1952; revised 1990)
Pas d’action (1952; withdrawn)
Maratona (1956, premiere 1957)
Undine (1956-7, premiere 1958)
L’usignolo dell’imperatore (1959, premiere 1959)
Tancredi (1964, premiere 1966)
Orpheus (1978, premiere 1979)
Le disperazioni del Signor Pulcinella, libretto by Sergio Sivori, (1992-5, premiere 1997; this ballet is an extended and revised version of Jack Pudding)
Le fils de l'air (1995-6, premiere 1997)

Choral
Fünf Madrigäle (1947)
Chor gefangener Trojer (1948; revised 1964)
Wiegenlied der Mutter Gottes (1948)
Jüdische Chronik (1960)
Novae de infinito laudes (1962)
Cantata della fiaba estrema (1963)
Lieder von einer Insel (1964)
Muzen Siziliens (1966)
Das Floß der Medusa (1968; revised 1990)
Mad People's Madrigal (1974–6)
Orpheus Behind the Wire (1981–3)
Hirtenlieder (1993–5)
Elogium Musicum (2008, in memory of Henze's partner Fausto Moroni)
Der Opfergang (2010)
An den Wind (2011)

Vocal solo
Sechs Lieder (1945; withdrawn)
Whispers from Heavenly Death (1948; revised 1999)
Der Vorwurf (1948; withdrawn)
Apollo et Hyazinthus (1948–9)
Chanson Pflastersteine (1950; withdrawn)
Fünf neapolitanische Lieder (1956)
Nachtstücke und Arien (1957)
Kammermusik 1958 (1958; revised 1963)
Drei Fragmente nach Hölderlin (1958)
Three Arias (1960; revised 1993)
Ariosi (1963)
Being Beauteous (1963)
Ein Landarzt (1964)
Versuch über Schweine (1968)
El Cimarrón (1969–70)
Voices (1973)
Heb doch die Stimme an (1975)
Kindermund (1975)
El rey de Harlem (1979)
Three Auden Songs (1983)
Drei Lieder über den Schnee (1989)
An Sascha (1991)
Zwei Konzertarien (1991)
Lieder und Tänze (1992–3)
Heilige Nacht (1993)
Heimlich zur Nacht (1994)
Nocturnal Serenade (1996)
Sechs Gesänge aus dem Arabischen (1997–8)

Chamber
Kleines Quartett, for oboe, violin, viola, and cello (1945; withdrawn)
Sonata, for violin and piano (1946)
Sonatina, for flute and piano (1947)
String Quartet no. 1 (1947)
Kammersonate (1948; revised 1963)
String Quartet no. 2 (1952)
Wind Quintet (1952)
Concerto per il Marigny (1956; withdrawn)
Quattro fantasie (1963)
Divertimenti (1964)
Der junge Törless (1966)
L'usignolo dell'imperatore (1970)
Fragmente aus einer Show, for brass quintet (1971)
Prison Song (1971)
Carillon, Récitatif, Masque (1974)
String Quartet no. 3 (1975–76)
Amicizia! (1976)
String Quartet no. 4 (1976)
String Quartet no. 5 (1976)
Konzertstück (1977–85)
L'autunno (1977)
Trauer-Ode für Margaret Geddes (1977)
Sonata, for viola and piano (1978–79)
Sonatina, for violin and piano (1979) [from the opera Pollicino]
Le miracle de la rose (Imaginäres Theater II), for clarinet and 13 musicians (1981)
Variation, for brass quintet (1981)
Von Krebs zu Krebs (1981)
Canzona (1982)
Sonata, for piccolo trumpet, 2 trumpets, flugelhorn, bass trumpet, 2 trombones, and bass trombone (1983)
Sonata, for flute, clarinet, violin, cello, percussion, and piano [from film score L'amour à mort] (1984)
Selbst- und Zwiegespräche (1984–85)
Ode an eine Äolsharfe (1985–86)
Eine kleine Hausmusik (1986)
Allegra e Boris (1987)
Fünf Nachtstücke (1990)
Paraphrasen über Dostojewsky (1990)
Piano Quintet (1990–91)
Adagio, for string sextet (1992)
Adagio, Serenade (1993)
Drei geistliche Konzerte (1994–6)
Notturno (1995)
Leçons de danse (1996)
Minotauros Blues (1996)
Neue Volkslieder und Hirtengesänge (1996)
Voie lactée ô soeur lumineuse (1996)
Drei Märchenbilder, for 2 guitars (1997) [arr. J. Ruck from opera Pollicino]
Ein kleines Potpourri, for flute, vibraphone, harp, and piano (2000) [from the opera Boulevard Solitude]

Solo instrumental
Sonatina for piano (1947; withdrawn)
Serenade, for cello (1949)
Variationen, for piano (1949)
Drei Tentos, for guitar (1958; from Kammermusik)
Piano Sonata (1959)
Six Absences, for harpsichord (1961)
Lucy Escott Variations, for harpsichord or piano (1963)
Memorias de ‘El Cimarrón’, for guitar (1970)
Sonatina for trumpet (1974)
Royal Winter Music, Sonata No. 1, for guitar (1975–6)
Capriccio, for cello (1976; revised 1981)
Sonata, for violin (1976–7; revised 1992)
Ländler, for violin (1977; withdrawn)
S. Biagio 9 agosto ore 12.07, for double bass (1977)
Five Scenes from the Snow Country, for marimba (1978)
Margareten-Walzer, for piano (1978)
Epitaph, for cello (1979)
Etude philarmonique, for violin (1979)
Royal Winter Music, Sonata No. 2, for guitar (1979)
Toccata senza fuga, for organ (1979; from Orpheus)
Drei Märchenbilder, for guitar (1980; from Pollicino)
Sechs Stücke für junge Pianisten, for piano (1980; from Orpheus)
Cherubino, 3 miniatures for piano (1980–81)
Euridice, for harpsichord (1981; revised 1992; from Pollicino)
Une petite phrase, for piano (1984; from the film score for Un amour de Swann)
Serenade, for violin (1986)
La mano sinistra, for piano left hand (1988)
Piece for Peter, for piano (1988)
Clavierstück, for piano (1989)
Für Manfred, for violin (1989)
Das Haus Ibach, for piano (1991)
Pulcinella disperato, fantasia, arrangement for piano (1991–2; from Le disperazioni del Signor Pulcinella))
Minette, arrangements for descant zither and for guitar (1992; from The English Cat)
An Brenton, for viola (1993)
Für Reinhold, for piano (1994)
Toccata mistica, for piano (1994)
Serenata notturna, for piano (1996; arrangement of Notturno)
Olly on the Shore, for piano (2001)
Scorribanda pianistica, for piano (2003)

Arrangements
Die schlafende Prinzessin (1951; withdrawn)
Don Chisciotte (1976)
Jephte (orat, orch of Carissimi) (1976)
Wesendonck-Lieder (1976)
Il ritorno d'Ulisse in patria (1981)
I sentimenti di Carl Philipp Emanuel Bach (1982)
Der Mann, der vom Tode auferstand (1988)
Fürwahr ...?! (1988)
Drei Mozartsche Orgelsonaten (1991)
Il re Teodoro in Venezia (1991–2)
Drei Orchesterstücke (1995)
Richard Wagnersche Klavierlieder (1998–9)

References

 Palmer-Füchsel, Virginia. 2001. "Henze, Hans Werner". The New Grove Dictionary of Music and Musicians, ed. S. Sadie and J. Tyrrell. London: Macmillan.

Lists of compositions by composer